Little Cypress is a large unincorporated community in the northern area of Orange, Texas. It is part of the Beaumont–Port Arthur Metropolitan Statistical Area. The settlement was probably named for nearby Little Cypress Bayou and began sometime after the Civil War when the first school was built.

The first census figures for Little Cypress were available in 1990, when the town reported 1,050 residents.
The area is not an official town, nor has it ever been, but is a part of the city of Orange.

Education
The Little Cypress-Mauriceville Consolidated Independent School District serves area students.

In 1927, the schools of Little Cypress and Gum Grove consolidated. A four-room brick school served as elementary and high schools. From 1931 to 1954, the community did not have high school classes; the high school grades were later re-established. In the late 20th century, the current consolidated school district was established.

References

External links 
 
 Orange County government's website

Unincorporated communities in Orange County, Texas
Unincorporated communities in Texas
Beaumont–Port Arthur metropolitan area